CFB may refer to:
College football
Canadian Forces base, military installation of the Canadian forces
Caminho de Ferro de Benguela, railway in Angola
Carrollton-Farmers Branch Independent School District
Cipher feedback, a block cipher mode in data encryption
Clube de Futebol «Os Belenenses», a football club in Portugal
Continental flood basalt, large volumes of dominantly tholeiitic basalt on continents
Complement factor B, a protein
Compact fluorescent bulb
Current feedback, a type of electronic feedback used in some operational amplifiers
Circulating fluidized bed, a type of fluidized bed used in power plants
Commission fédérale des banques (Swiss Federal Banking Commission)
CFB, the IATA code for Cabo Frio International Airport
CFB, the National Rail station code for Catford Bridge railway station
CFB is acronym for Call Forwarding when Busy telecom service
Circulating fluidized bed combustion 
Cfb, one of four symbols for the Oceanic climate under the Köppen climate classification system
Cytophaga-Flavobacteria-Bacteroides group, a previous name for the current Bacteroidota phylum
Change From Baseline, a tool used in clinical trials to measure the safety and efficacy of therapeutic interventions 
Swedish Central Federation for Voluntary Military Training